An automotive head unit, sometimes called the infotainment system, is a component providing a unified hardware interface for the system, including screens, buttons and system controls for numerous integrated information and entertainment functions.

Other names for automotive head units include car stereo, car receiver, deck, in-dash stereo, and dash stereo.

Function 

Central to a vehicle's sound and information systems, head units are located prominently in the center of the dashboard or console, and provide an integrated electronic package.

The head unit provides a user interface for the vehicle's information and entertainment media components: AM/FM radio, satellite radio, DVDs/CDs, cassette tapes (although these are now uncommon), USB MP3, dashcams, GPS navigation, Bluetooth, Wi-Fi, and sometimes vehicle systems status. Moreover, it may provide control of audio functions including volume, band, frequency, speaker balance, speaker fade, bass, treble, equalization, and so on. With the advent of dashcams, GPS navigation, and DVDs, head units with video screens are widely available, integrating voice control and gesture recognition.

Size standards 
An original standard head unit size is ISO 7736, developed by the Deutsches Institut für Normung (DIN):

Single DIN in Europe, South America, and Australasia
 A compact size that easily fits into a dashboard, but the unit is not tall enough to accommodate a video display.
Double DIN in Japan, the UK, and North America.
 Doubling the height of the single DIN, a video display or touchscreen can be fitted to support manufacturer GUIs, Android Auto, and/or Apple CarPlay.
 Double DIN is also written as 2 DIN and double din.

For both single and double DIN units, ISO 10487 is the connectors standard for connecting the head unit to the car's electrical system.

Steering and aftermarket brands 

Manufacturers offer DIN headunits and standard connectors (called universal headunits), including Pioneer, Sony, Alpine, Kenwood, Eclipse, JVC, Boyo, Dual, Visteon, Advent and Blaupunkt.

See also
 Aftermarket
 Android Auto
 CarPlay
 Connectors for car audio
 Vehicle audio

References

In-car entertainment
Consumer electronics
Dashboard head units